Sagaie may refer to:
 ERC 90 Sagaie, a French armoured vehicle
 a form of bone or antler point, thought to be the head of a harpoon or spear, characteristic of the Magdalenian, Solutrean and other Upper Paleolithic cultures in Europe. 

The word derives from the same root as assegai.